Cabinet Kraft was the name of the government of the German state of North Rhine-Westphalia from July 2010 until June 2012.

Its leader was Hannelore Kraft, elected and sworn in as Minister-President by the Landtag of North Rhine-Westphalia on 14 July 2010. The following day she appointed and swore in her cabinet.

The government was a coalition government of the center-left Social Democratic Party of Germany and the Green party, who formed a minority government that was short of one seat from the absolute majority in the state parliament, the Landtag. The government failed to get its budget approved by the Parliament in 2012, so the Parliament was dissolved. The subsequent election was won by the two governing parties who went on to form Cabinet Kraft II.

The following table shows cabinet members, who held the office of ministers of their respective portfolio except when denoted otherwise. Note that only the Ministers are members of the Cabinet. The Head of the Minister-President's Office, as a Secretary of State, is not an official member of cabinet, but is invited as non-voting attendee.

Kraft I
2010 establishments in Germany
2012 disestablishments in Germany